Marquette County is a county located in the Upper Peninsula of the U.S. state of Michigan. As of the 2020 Census, the population was 66,017. The county seat is Marquette. The county is named for Father Marquette, a Jesuit missionary. It was set off in 1843 and organized in 1851. Marquette County is the largest county in land area in Michigan, and the most populous county in the Upper Peninsula of Michigan.

Marquette County comprises the Marquette, MI Micropolitan Statistical Area.

Geography
It is the largest county in Michigan by land area and fourth-largest by total area.

The Huron Mountains are located in the county. To the north of the county is Lake Superior.

Adjacent counties

Alger County, east
Delta County, southeast
Menominee County, south/CT Border
Dickinson County, south/CT Border
Iron County, southwest/CT Border
Baraga County, west
Houghton County, northwest
Keweenaw County, north

National protected areas
 Hiawatha National Forest (part)
 Huron National Wildlife Refuge
 Ottawa National Forest (part)

Climate

Economy

Top employers

Last updated June 8, 2021.

According to the Lake Superior Community Partnership website, the top employers in the county are:

*Bolded values have been updated for 2021.

Transportation

Airports

Major highways

 
 
 
 
 
 
The road commission provides maintenance such as snow removal under contract with the Michigan Department of Transportation for the state trunklines. In 2010, the commission planned to build CR 595. The project was canceled after the permit was denied by the Michigan Department of Environmental Quality and the project funding was diverted.

Demographics

The 2010 United States Census, indicates Marquette County had a population of 67,077. This increase of 2,443 people from 2000 represents a growth of 3.8%. In 2010 there were 27,538 households and 16,664 families in the county. The population density was 37 people per square mile (16/km2). There were 34,330 housing units at an average density of 19 per square mile (8/km2). 93.8% of the population were White, 1.7% Native American, 1.7% Black or African American, 0.6% Asian, 0.2% of some other race and 2.0% of two or more races. 1.1% were Hispanic or Latino (of any race). 18.8% were of Finnish, 13.3% German, 10.5% French, French Canadian or Cajun, 9.3% English, 6.8% Italian, 6.2% Irish and 5.8% Swedish ancestry.

There were 27,538 households, out of which 23.4% had children under the age of 18 living with them, 47.8% were married couples living together, 8.6% had a female householder with no husband present, and 39.5% were non-families. 20.4% of all households were made up of individuals, and 10.6% had someone living alone who was 65 years of age or older. The average household size was 2.26 and the average family size was 2.81.

The county population contained 18.7% were under the age of 18, 14.8% from 18 to 24, 23.0% from 25 to 44, 28.9% from 45 to 64, and 14.7% were 65 years of age or older. The median age was 39.4 years. The population is 50.5% male and 49.5% female.

The median income for a household in the county was $46,875, and the median income for a family was $52,083. The per capita income for the county was $22,170. About 6.4% of families and 12.5% of the population were below the poverty line, including 20.3% of those under age 18 and 12.5% of those age 65 or over.

Government
Marquette County was reliably Republican following the American Civil War; its voters went Republican (or Republican-splinter) in every election from 1876 through 1932. However, that shifted in 1936; since then, the Republican nominee has carried the county in only five out of 22 elections through 2020, and it has become the only reliably Democratic county in the Upper Peninsula.

The county government operates Sawyer International Airport, the jail, maintains rural roads, operates the major local courts, records deeds, mortgages, and vital records, administers public health regulations, and participates with the state in the provision of social services. The county board of commissioners controls the budget and has limited authority to make laws or ordinances. In Michigan, most local government functions—police and fire, building and zoning, tax assessment, street maintenance, etc.—are the responsibility of individual cities and townships.

Elected officials
 County Clerk: Linda Talsma
 County Treasurer: Jacqueline Solomon
 Drain Commissioner: P. Michael Farrell
 Mine Inspector: Steve Bertucci
 Prosecuting Attorney: Matthew J. Wiese
 Register of Deeds: Carla L'Huillier
 Sheriff: Gregory S. Zyburt

Education
Northern Michigan University is a four-year university in Marquette. It was established in 1899.

Historical markers
There are ten historical markers in the county:
 Cliffs Shaft Mine
 Dandelion Cottage
 Father Marquette Park
 First Steam Railroad in Upper Peninsula
 Ishpeming: Historic Ski Center
 Jackson Mine
 Marquette County Courthouse
 Marquette Iron Range
 Northern Michigan University
 Sam Cohodas Lodge / Sam Cohodas

Communities

Cities
 Ishpeming
 Marquette (county seat)
 Negaunee

Charter townships
 Chocolay Charter Township
 Marquette Charter Township

Civil townships

 Champion Township
 Ely Township
 Ewing Township
 Forsyth Township
 Humboldt Township
 Ishpeming Township
 Michigamme Township
 Negaunee Township
 Powell Township
 Republic Township
 Richmond Township
 Sands Township
 Skandia Township
 Tilden Township
 Turin Township
 Wells Township
 West Branch Township

Census-designated places

 Big Bay
 Gwinn
 Harvey
 K.I. Sawyer
 Michigamme
 Palmer
 Republic
 Trowbridge Park
 West Ishpeming

Other unincorporated communities

 Alder
 Antlers
 Arnold
 Beaver Grove
 Birch
 Brookton Corners
 Carlshend
 Clarksburg
 Dukes
 Eagle Mills
 Empire Iron Mine
 Gordon
 Green Garden
 Greenwood 
 Homeier
 Huron Mountain
 Lakewood
 Lawson
 Little Lake
 Maple Grove
 McFarland
 Midway Location
 National Mine
 North Lake
 Northland
 Sand River
 Selma
 Snowville
 South Greenwood
 South Republic
 Suomi Location
 Vick
 Witch Lake

Indian reservations
The L'Anse Indian Reservation, which is primarily based in Baraga County to the west, has a small portion within Chocolay Township.
The Sault Tribe of Chippewa Indians, which is headquartered in Sault Ste. Marie in Chippewa County, occupies a very small piece of property within the city limits of Marquette.

See also
 List of Michigan State Historic Sites in Marquette County, Michigan
National Register of Historic Places listings in Marquette County, Michigan

References

External links
Marquette County web site

 
Michigan counties
1851 establishments in Michigan
Populated places established in 1851